The Elements of Style is an American English writing style guide in numerous editions. The original was written by William Strunk Jr. in 1918, and published by Harcourt in 1920, comprising eight "elementary rules of usage", ten "elementary principles of composition", "a few matters of form", a list of 49 "words and expressions commonly misused", and a list of 57 "words often misspelled". E. B. White greatly enlarged and revised the book for publication by Macmillan in 1959. That was the first edition of the so-called Strunk & White, which Time named in 2011 as one of the 100 best and most influential books written in English since 1923. 

American poet Dorothy Parker said, regarding the book:

History
Cornell University English professor William Strunk Jr. wrote The Elements of Style in 1918 and privately published it in 1919, for use at the university. (Harcourt republished it in 52-page format in 1920.) He and editor Edward A. Tenney later revised it for publication as The Elements and Practice of Composition (1935). In 1957 the style guide reached the attention of E.B. White at The New Yorker. White had studied writing under Strunk in 1919 but had since forgotten "the little book" that he described as a "forty-three-page summation of the case for cleanliness, accuracy, and brevity in the use of English".  Weeks later, White wrote about Strunk's devotion to lucid English prose in his column.

Macmillan and Company subsequently commissioned White to revise The Elements for a 1959 edition (Strunk had died in 1946). White's expansion and modernization of Strunk and Tenney's 1935 revised edition yielded the writing style manual informally known as "Strunk & White", the first edition of which sold about two million copies in 1959. More than ten million copies of three editions were later sold. Mark Garvey relates the history of the book in Stylized: A Slightly Obsessive History of Strunk & White's The Elements of Style (2009).

Maira Kalman, who provided the illustrations for The Elements of Style Illustrated (2005, see below), asked Nico Muhly to compose a cantata based on the book. It was performed at the New York Public Library in October 2005.

Audiobook versions of The Elements now feature changed wording, citing "gender issues" with the original.

Content
Strunk concentrated on the cultivation of good writing and composition; the original 1918 edition exhorted writers to "omit needless words", use the active voice, and employ parallelism appropriately.

The 1959 edition features White's expansions of preliminary sections, the "Introduction" essay (derived from his magazine story about Strunk), and the concluding chapter, "An Approach to Style", a broader, prescriptive guide to writing in English. He also produced the second (1972) and third (1979) editions of The Elements of Style, by which time the book's length had extended to 85 pages.

The third edition of The Elements of Style (1979) features 54 points: a list of common word-usage errors; 11 rules of punctuation and grammar; 11 principles of writing; 11 matters of form; and, in Chapter V, 21 reminders for better style. The final reminder, the 21st, "Prefer the standard to the offbeat", is thematically integral to the subject of The Elements of Style, yet does stand as a discrete essay about writing lucid prose. To write well, White advises writers to have the proper mind-set, that they write to please themselves, and that they aim for "one moment of felicity", a phrase by Robert Louis Stevenson. Thus Strunk's 1918 recommendation:

Strunk Jr.  no longer has a comma in his name in the 1979 and later editions, due to the modernized style recommendation about punctuating such names.

The fourth edition of The Elements of Style (2000), published 54 years after Strunk's death, omits his stylistic advice about masculine pronouns: "unless the antecedent is or must be feminine". In its place, the following sentence has been added: "many writers find the use of the generic he or his to rename indefinite antecedents limiting or offensive." Further, the re-titled entry "They. He or She", in Chapter IV: Misused Words and Expressions, advises the writer to avoid an "unintentional emphasis on the masculine".

Components new to the fourth edition include a foreword by Roger Angell, stepson of E. B. White, an afterword by the American cultural commentator Charles Osgood, a glossary, and an index. Five years later, the fourth edition text was re-published as The Elements of Style Illustrated (2005), with illustrations by the designer Maira Kalman. This edition excludes the afterword by Osgood and restores the first edition chapter on spelling.

Reception
The Elements of Style was listed as one of the 100 best and most influential books written in English since 1923 by Time in its 2011 list. Upon its release, Charles Poor, writing for The New York Times, called it "a splendid trophy for all who are interested in reading and writing." 

Criticism of Strunk & White has largely focused on claims that it has a prescriptivist nature, or that it has become a general anachronism in the face of modern English usage.

In criticizing The Elements of Style, Geoffrey Pullum, professor of linguistics at the University of Edinburgh, and co-author of The Cambridge Grammar of the English Language (2002), said that: 

Pullum has argued, for example, that the authors misunderstood what constitutes the passive voice, and he criticized their proscription of established and unproblematic English usages, such as the split infinitive and the use of which in a restrictive relative clause. On Language Log, a blog about language written by linguists, he further criticized The Elements of Style for promoting linguistic prescriptivism and hypercorrection among Anglophones, and called it "the book that ate America's brain".

The Boston Globe review described The Elements of Style Illustrated (2005), with illustrations by Maira Kalman, as an "aging zombie of a book ... a hodgepodge, its now-antiquated pet peeves jostling for space with 1970s taboos and 1990s computer advice".

Nevertheless, many contemporary authors still recommend it highly. Their praise tends to focus on its characterization of good writing and how to achieve it, grammar being just one element of that purpose. In On Writing (2000, p. 11), Stephen King writes: "There is little or no detectable bullshit in that book. (Of course, it's short; at eighty-five pages it's much shorter than this one.) I'll tell you right now that every aspiring writer should read The Elements of Style. Rule 17 in the chapter titled Principles of Composition is 'Omit needless words.' I will try to do that here."

In 2011, Tim Skern remarked that The Elements of Style "remains the best book available on writing good English".

In 2013, Nevile Gwynne reproduced The Elements of Style in his work Gwynne's Grammar. Britt Peterson of the Boston Globe wrote that his inclusion of the book was a "curious addition".

In 2016, the Open Syllabus Project lists The Elements of Style as the most frequently assigned text in US academic syllabuses, based on an analysis of 933,635 texts appearing in over 1 million syllabuses.

Editions

Strunk
 Elements of Style. Composed in 1918 and privately printed in 1919. 43 pages. .
 The Elements of Style. New York: Harcourt, Brace and Howe, 1920. 52-page publication of the original.

(Because the text of Strunk's original is now in the public domain and freely available on the Internet, publishers can and do reprint it in book form.)

Strunk & Edward A. Tenney
 The Elements and Practice of Composition. New York: Harcourt, Brace, 1935. Despite the new title, an expansion of (The) Elements of Style; 60 pages plus 47 "practice leaves".

Strunk & White
 The Elements of Style. New York: Macmillan, 1959. .
 The Elements of Style. 2nd ed. New York: Macmillan; London: Collier-Macmillan, 1972. .
 The Elements of Style. 3rd ed. New York: Macmillan, 1979.  (hardback),  (paperback).
 The Elements of Style. 4th ed. S.l.: Longman, 1999. Hardback.  (hardback). S.l.: Longman, 2000.  (paperback). With a foreword by Roger Angell.
 The Elements of Style Illustrated. With illustrations by Maira Kalman. Penguin, 2005.  (hardback). Penguin, 2005.  (hardback). Penguin.  (paperback).  Penguin, 2008.  (paperback).
 The Elements of Style. Fiftieth Anniversary Edition. New York: Pearson Longman, 2009. . Contains the 4th ed. text; with a foreword by Charles Osgood.

See also
 The Complete Plain Words
 A Dictionary of Modern English Usage
 Style: Lessons in Clarity and Grace

Several books were titled paying homage to Strunk's, for example:

 The Elements of Programming Style
 The Elements of Typographic Style

References

External links

  (Strunk 1918)
  (Strunk 1918)
 Revision of Strunk's original text by John W. Cowan (2006–2008).
 .
 Radio piece from NPR discussing illustrated Strunk & White book and musical adaptation.
 Catherine Prendergast: "The Fighting Style: Reading the Unabomber's Strunk and White", College English, Volume 72, Number 1, September 2009.

1918 books
Style guides for American English
Works by E. B. White
Self-published books
Composition (language)